Albert Edward Dyment (February 23, 1869 – May 12, 1944) was a Canadian politician and businessman.

Born at Lynden, County of Wentworth, Ontario, the son of Nathaniel Dyment, of English descent, and Annie McRae, of Scottish origin, he was educated at Barrie Collegiate Institute and at Upper Canada College. Dyment was a prosperous manufacturer and dealer in lumber, based in Thessalon, Ontario. He was elected for Algoma to the House of Commons in 1896 and in 1900 and for Algoma East in 1904 as a Liberal. He was Honorary Lieutenant-Colonel of the 97th Regiment in 1907.

In 1892, he married Edith Francis Chapman. He served on the town council for Barrie in 1892. In 1906, he sold his business and became a stockbroker in Toronto. Dyment was president of Sovereign Life Assurance Company and chairman of Canadian General Electric. He died in Toronto at the age of 75.

Notes

References

External links 
 

1869 births
1944 deaths
Canadian stockbrokers
Members of the House of Commons of Canada from Ontario
Liberal Party of Canada MPs